Naudedrillia is a genus of sea snails, marine gastropod mollusks in the family Pseudomelatomidae.

Species
Species within the genus Naudedrillia include:

 Naudedrillia angulata Kilburn, 1988
 Naudedrillia cerea Kilburn, 1988
 Naudedrillia filosa Kilburn, 1988
 Naudedrillia hayesi Kilburn, 2005
 Naudedrillia mitromorpha Kilburn, 1988
 Naudedrillia nealyoungi Kilburn, 1988
 Naudedrillia perardua Kilburn, 1988
 Naudedrillia praetermissa (Smith E. A., 1904)

References

 Kilburn R.N. (1988). Turridae (Mollusca: Gastropoda) of southern Africa and Mozambique. Part 4. Subfamilies Drillinae, Crassispirinae and Strictispirinae. Annals of the Natal Museum. 29(1): 167–320.

External links
 
 Bouchet, P.; Kantor, Y. I.; Sysoev, A.; Puillandre, N. (2011). A new operational classification of the Conoidea (Gastropoda). Journal of Molluscan Studies. 77(3): 273-308
 MNHN, Paris: Naudedrilia sp.
 Worldwide Mollusc Species Data Base: Pseudomelatomidae

 
Pseudomelatomidae
Gastropod genera